General Rodríguez is a western partido of Buenos Aires Province, in Argentina. It is a district on the far western outskirts of Greater Buenos Aires.

Name
The partido and its capital are named after Martín Rodríguez, a hero of the defense of Buenos Aires from the British invasion of 1806, a veteran of the Argentine War of Independence, and a former governor of Buenos Aires.

Geographic Location
It is also bounded by Pilar, Moreno, Marcos Paz, Merlo and Luján cities. The physical geography of the place corresponds to the Urbanised Pampeana Prairie of Buenos Aires.

Population
According to the preliminary estimates of the total population for General Rodríguez of the census of 2010, the population is 87,491 inhabitants.

• Population in 1991: 48,383 inhabitants (INDEC, 1991)
• Population in 2001: 67,931 inhabitants (INDEC, 2001)

Sports in the city
General Rodríguez is home to several polo clubs of Argentina.

External links

   Website for Gral. Rodríguez

 
1878 establishments in Argentina
Partidos of Buenos Aires Province